The 1987 season in Swedish football, starting January 1987 and ending December 1987:

Honours

Official titles

Competitions

Promotions, relegations and qualifications

Promotions

League transfers

Relegations

International qualifications

Domestic results

Allsvenskan 1987

Allsvenskan play-off 1987 
Semi-finals

Final

Division 1 Norra 1987

Division 1 Södra 1987

Svenska Cupen 1986–87 
Final

National team results

Notes

References 
Print

Online

 
Seasons in Swedish football